Ramón Briones Luco (1872–1949) was a Chilean lawyer and radical politician. He was born in Chimbarongo on 6 December 1872 and died in Johannesburg on 16 August 1949. He was the son of Francisco Javier Arriagada and Doña Lucinda Briones Luco Avaria. He married Camila Carvajal Miranda.

Professional career
Ramón Luco studied at the St. Thomas Aquinas College, of the National Institute and the Faculty of Law at the University of Chile, where he was sworn in as an attorney on 26 October 1898. His thesis  was on "Divorce".

He joined the civil service in the Ministry of Foreign Affairs as Chief of the Section on Religion and Settlement (1896) and as a Fiscal Defence Lawyer (1907).

Political career
He was a member of the Radical Party, and was elected Parliamentary Representative for the Departmental Grouping of Tarapaca and Pisagua for two consecutive terms (1915-1921). He joined the Standing Committee on Foreign Affairs and Colonization and chaired the House of Representatives (1918-1920).

He presented the first draft of his project on divorce to the House but it was not approved. He also presented drafts on secular compulsory primary education, the rights of private employees, professional risks and work-related accidents, among other motions.

He was Minister of Industry, Public Works and Railways (1918), in the Juan Luis Sanfuentes administration, a member of the Court of Honor in the Arturo Alessandri election and Attorney for the Fiscal Defence Council of Tarapaca and Antofagasta (1921-1924).

He was elected Senator for the province of Tarapaca (1921-1926), a member of the Standing Committee on Finance and Municipal Loans, Agriculture, Industry and Railways and Interior Police. 
He was Minister of Foreign Affairs, Religion and Settlement (1924), appointed by Arturo Alessandri Palma. That same year he was elected National President of his party, el Radical.

Work
Ramón Briones Luco dedicated himself to writing articles in newspapers and magazines. He received awards including the Grand Cross Crown of Italy. He belonged to the Scientific Society of Chile, the poor Students Protection League and Social Hygiene among others.

He was director and Advisor to the Central Bank (1939) and Chilean ambassador to Italy that year. He returned to the country in 1940 where he retired from politics.

References 

1872 births
1949 deaths
People from Colchagua Province
Chilean people of Spanish descent
Radical Party of Chile politicians
Chilean Ministers of Public Works
Foreign ministers of Chile
Deputies of the XXXI Legislative Period of the National Congress of Chile
Deputies of the XXXII Legislative Period of the National Congress of Chile
Senators of the XXXIII Legislative Period of the National Congress of Chile
19th-century Chilean lawyers
20th-century Chilean lawyers